Nebula is a federal cloud computing platform that originated at NASA Ames Research Center at Moffett Field, California.  The Nebula project was run under the ACITS 2 contract originally held by Perot Systems.  Nebula hosted many advanced research projects.  One application Open Sourced by NASA and developed by the Nebula project, 'nova' became one of the two founding projects of the OpenStack project.

History 

The Ames Internet Exchange (AIX), was formerly MAE-West, one of the original nodes of the Internet, and is a major peering location for Tier 1 ISPs, as well as being the home of the "E" root name servers.  The AIX provides connectivity to the Nebula Cloud, enabling 10 Gigabit Ethernet connections to NISN.

The Nebula-Project uses a variety of free and open-source software.

See also 
 OpenNebula
 OpenStack
 Eucalyptus (computing)
 Ganeti

References

External links 
 
Interview with Chris C. Kemp about NASA Nebula on Federal News Radio
Chris C. Kemp participation in Meritalk/AFFIRM Luncheon CIO/CFO Panel: The New IT Economics May 21, 2009

Cloud platforms
Cloud computing providers
NASA